AS Lössi is a New Caledonian football team playing at the top level. It is based in Nouméa.  Their home stadium is Stade Numa-Daly.

Achievements
New Caledonia Cup: 3
 2006–07, 2012, 2017

The club in the French football structure
French Cup: 3 appearances
2007–08, 2012–13, 2017–18

Current squad
Squad for the 2018 OFC Champions League

References
 

Football clubs in New Caledonia